aisle411 Inc. is a St. Louis based company that has developed a consumer service called aisle411, which allows customers to use their phones to find products in stores. Founded in 2008 by Nathan Pettyjohn (Founder) and Matthew Kulig (Co-Founder), aisle411 entered the market in August 2009 with a mobile service that allowed consumers to search retail stores for product locations inside stores using their mobile phones.

History
In August 2009, aisle411 launched its original product location service in the St. Louis and Springfield, MO areas, servicing Ace Hardware and Price Cutter stores . In 2010, aisle411 launched its mobile smartphone service with Shop 'n Save, a grocery chain owned by Supervalu and Schnucks grocery stores in the St. Louis, MO area. In September 2011, WinCo Foods partnered with aisle411 to deploy its technology to all its 79 stores. In December 2011, Hy-Vee, a grocery chain of 235 store locations launched the aisle411 platform within their mobile iPhone and Android applications allowing shoppers to map products, lists, and weekly ads. In September 2012, Walgreens launched the aisle411 platform in its iPhone and Android mobile applications, making Walgreens in-store inventory searchable and mappable in over 7,800 locations.

In September 2012, aisle411 acquired the technology assets of WiLocate, adding indoor mobile device positioning technology to its service offering.

In September 2013, aisle411 raised $6.3 million in its first round of financing - led by St. Louis-based Cultivation Capital - to help the company scale, meet demand and expand retail partnerships. Billiken Angels Network has also invested in aisle411.

Services 
aisle411 allows consumers with Smart Phones to pull up a map pinpointing the aisle and location of the object of their desire in a particular store. The aisle411 platform is made available for licensing to retailers, and 3rd parties through an API and Map SDK. Shoppers can also use the app to scan barcodes to read product reviews and find out about in-store discounts and promotions. aisle411 went live in the iTunes Store around Thanksgiving.

References

External links
Official website www.aisle411.com

Promotion and marketing communications
Marketing companies established in 2008
Software companies established in 2008
Companies based in St. Louis
2009 establishments in Missouri